The Little Russia Governorate or Government of Malorossiya was an administrative-territorial unit (guberniya) of the Russian Empire that encompassed most of the modern North Eastern Ukraine (one of the historical definitions of Little Russia hence the name), and the adjacent regions in Russia.

The Governorate was formed in 1796 under the administrative reforms of Paul I which abolished the Namestnichestvo (viceroyalty) system, which in turn replaced the regimental administration of the Ukrainian Hetmanate in 1781. This placed the Kiev Viceroyalty (excluding the city of Kyiv itself), Novgorod-Seversky Viceroyalty and Chernigov Viceroyalty under the new unit. The administrative centre was the city of Chernigov (modern Chernihiv).

However, the extensive area which the new unit covered was too great for effective administration, and in February 1802 the Governorate was split into Chernigov Governorate and Poltava Governorate.

External links
 Little Russia Governorate in the Encyclopedia of History of Ukraine

 
Governorates of the Russian Empire
Governorates of Ukraine
Political history of Ukraine
1796 establishments in the Russian Empire
1802 disestablishments in the Russian Empire
1790s in Ukraine
1800s in Ukraine